The next legislative elections in South Korea are scheduled to be held on 10 April 2024.

Electoral system

Political parties

Notes

References

Legislative elections in South Korea
South Korea
South Korea